An der Finne is a Verbandsgemeinde ("collective municipality") in the Burgenlandkreis (district), in Saxony-Anhalt, Germany. Before the 1 July 2009 local government reform, it was a Verwaltungsgemeinschaft, covering the same area, but subdivided into more municipalities. It is named after the Finne, a range of hills between Lossa and Eckartsberga. It is situated approximately 20 km west of Naumburg, and 25 km northeast of Weimar. The seat of the Verwaltungsgemeinschaft is in Bad Bibra.

The Verbandsgemeinde An der Finne consists of the following municipalities:

 An der Poststraße
 Bad Bibra
 Eckartsberga
 Finne 
 Finneland 
 Kaiserpfalz 
 Lanitz-Hassel-Tal

References

Former Verwaltungsgemeinschaften in Saxony-Anhalt
Verbandsgemeinden in Saxony-Anhalt